Hectaphelia mensaria is a species of moth of the family Tortricidae. It is found in KwaZulu-Natal, South Africa.

References

Endemic moths of South Africa
Moths described in 1912
Archipini